"There's Got to Be a Way" is a song recorded by American singer-songwriter Mariah Carey for her eponymous debut studio album (1990). Columbia released it as the fifth and final single from the album only in the United Kingdom on May 20, 1991. It was one of four songs Carey wrote with Ric Wake during their first recording session together in February 1990, but "There's Got to Be a Way" was the only composition to make the final track listing. Carey released a five-track digital extended play containing remixes of the song in July 2020 as part of her 30th-anniversary celebrations of her debut album.

"There's Got to Be a Way" is a socio-political conscious R&B-pop song which denounces the existence of poverty, racism and war in the world which gradually becomes aspirational and hopeful as it progresses. The track garnered a mixed reception upon the album's release in 1990; while Carey's vocals were praised, it was seen as too political. An accompanying music video for the song highlights social injustices. The song reached number 54 on the UK Singles Chart. In May 2020, Carey performed a snippet of the song in a video posted online in response to the murder of George Floyd.

Background and release
"There's Got to Be a Way" was composed by Mariah Carey and  Ric Wake for Carey's self-titled debut studio album (1990); the lyrics were written by Carey, while she and Wake composed the music. It was written during Carey and Wake's first recording session together. They composed four songs, but only "There's Got to Be a Way" was chosen for the final track listing. Co-produced by Wake and Narada Michael Walden, it appears as the second of eleven songs on the track listing.

The track was recorded in February 1990 and engineered by Bob Cadway at Cove City Sound Studios and The Power Station, both located in New York City; he was assisted by Dana Jon Chappelle. It was mixed by David Frazer at Tarpan Studios in San Rafael. The keyboards, bass and rhythm engineering was carried out by Louis Biancaniello, while Joe Franco performed the percussion, Vernon "Ice" Black played the guitar, and Rich Tancredo also performing on the keyboards. Walter Afanasieff played the synth horns. Carey provided her own background vocals along with Billy T. Scott, Jamiliah Muhammed and The Billy T. Scott Ensemble. The song was released in the United Kingdom as the fifth and final single on May 20, 1991.

On July 24, 2020, Carey released a five-track digital extended play of the song as part of her 30th-anniversary celebrations of her debut album Mariah Carey. Titled There's Got to Be a Way EP and released in tandem with an eight-track EP of "Someday", it contains "hard-to-find and unreleased makeovers" of the original album track, including both the 7-inch and 12-inch versions (the latter of which was previously only available on vinyl), the "Vocal Dub Mix" and "Alt. Vocal Dub Mix", as well as the "Sample Dub Mix", with the third and fifth being previously unreleased. Gil Kaufman of Billboard called its release a "revelation" for fans in the United States, owing to "There's Got to Be a Way" originally released only in the United Kingdom.

Composition
"There's Got to Be a Way" is an R&B-pop music song with elements of gospel, lasting for a duration for four minutes and 52 seconds. The song begins with Carey publicly decrying the existence of war, poverty and racism in the world, and she uses the bridge to shift the lyrics towards an uplifting and aspirational tone. A "peaceful, political anthem," the theme of social activism can be heard in the lyrics "There's got to be a way/ To connect this world today/ Come together to relieve the pain/ There's got to be a way/ To unite this human race/ And together we'll bring on a change." Carey goes on to suggest that we should be more tolerant of each other and not resort so readily to war in the lyrics "Couldn't we accept each other / Can't we make ourselves aware."

Critical reception
J.D. Considine from The Baltimore Sun named "There's Got to Be a Way" one of the album's "best songs", describing it as "gloriously engaging". Music critic Robert Christgau felt that Carey was being too political in her "brave, young, idealistic attack" on war and destitution. Ralph Novak, David Hiltbrand and David Grogan of People wrote that it is a "testimony to her talent that she does so much with so little." They continued to write that Carey's "tone and clarity" makes "There's Got to Be a Way" a "mesmerizing" track. To mark twenty-five years since the release of Mariah Carey in June 1990, Billboard writer Trevor Anderson wrote a track-by-track review of the album in June 2015. He noted that "There's Got to Be a Way" follows the same melodic tone as the album's opener "Vision of Love" but highlighted their stark lyrical differences, as the former is about social activism and the latter is about love. Although he praised Carey's vocals, writing that she "deploys" one of her best whistle notes of her career, he felt that "the aim for broad appeal comes at the expense of memorable lyrics."

Similarly in December 2015, Kelsey McKinney of the G/O Media owned Splinter News compiled a selection of reviews of how Carey and her debut album were received in 1990; "There's Got to Be a Way" was mentioned in Alan Niester's review for the Canadian publication The Globe and Mail. He commented that, as did most critics, Carey's vocals were reminiscent of already established female singers, including Whitney Houston and Lisa Stansfield, with their vocal influences most apparent on the song as well as "Alone in Love", specifically. It was because of this, he writes, that despite Carey having a vocal ability that is "worth watching," what she is singing vocally is more interesting than what she is singing lyrically, having not yet found her own style.

Music video
The accompanying music video for "There's Got to Be a Way" begins with a shot of an empty street, followed by clips of disadvantaged and poorer members of society going about their daily activities. Two men play dominoes on a wooden crate outside a building, a gang make fun of an elderly man hanging newspapers outside his store and an obese woman walks down the street. Clips of Carey leaning against a wall and sitting on some steps looking on at what is happening are shown. As the first chorus begins, everyone starts to dance joyfully in the street and help those in need. A gospel choir comes out of one of the buildings as the street becomes more crowded with people of all ages and backgrounds rejoicing and getting along with each other. One of the shops in the background has a neon light outside the entrance which says "Jesus Saves."

Live performance
Carey performed a couple of lines of the song for the first time in a short video on May 30, 2020, in response to the murder of George Floyd, an African American man killed during his arrest by Derek Chauvin, a White American police officer, in Minneapolis on May 25. Carey posted the video clip online, singing the lyrics "I don't understand how there can be regulated bigotry. There's got to be a way to connect this world today," focusing on its lyrics denouncing racism. She captioned the video with "I wrote this song for my first album. Still looking for answers today. We have to make a change. We can't be silent," followed by the hashtag Black Lives Matter and an encouragement to her fans to donate to the Color of Change campaign to prohibit the officers involved from working in law enforcement in the future and to be prosecuted for Floyd's murder.

Formats and track listings

 European 12"
"There's Got to Be a Way" (12" Remix) – 8:21
"There's Got to Be a Way" (Alt. Vocal Dub Mix) – 6:44
"There's Got to Be a Way" (7" Remix) – 4:50

 European Maxi CD
"There's Got to Be a Way" – 4:52
"I Don't Wanna Cry" – 4:47
"There's Got to Be a Way" (12" Remix) – 8:21

 UK Cassette Single
"There's Got to Be a Way" (Album Version) – 4:51
"There's Got to Be a Way" (7" Remix) – 4:50

 UK Maxi CD
"There's Got to Be a Way" – 4:51
"There's Got to Be a Way" (12" Remix) – 8:21
"There's Got to Be a Way" (Alt. Vocal Dub Mix) – 6:44

 UK Picture Disc Maxi CD
"There's Got to Be a Way" – 4:51
"There's Got to Be a Way" (7" Remix) – 4:50
"Someday" (7" Jackswing Mix) – 4:40
"Vision of Love" – 3:28

 UK 12" promo
"There's Got To Be a Way" (12" Remix) – 8:21
"There's Got To Be a Way" (Alt. Vocal Dub Mix) – 6:44
"There's Got To Be a Way" (Sample Dub Mix) – 6:00
"There's Got To Be a Way" (7" Remix) – 4:50

 There's Got to Be a Way EP
"There's Got to Be a Way" (7" Remix) – 4:53
"There's Got to Be a Way" (12" Remix) – 8:21
"There's Got to Be a Way" (Vocal Dub Mix) – 7:06
"There's Got to Be a Way" (Alt. Vocal Dub Mix) – 6:46
"There's Got to Be a Way" (Sample Dub Mix) – 6:04

Charts

Release history

References

1990 songs
1991 singles
Mariah Carey songs
Songs written by Mariah Carey
Songs written by Ric Wake
Song recordings produced by Ric Wake
Song recordings produced by Narada Michael Walden
Columbia Records singles
Sony Music singles
Songs against racism and xenophobia